Em Agaleh Seyyed Sabus (also Romanized as Em ʿAgaleh Seyyed Sabūs) is a village in Elhayi Rural District, in the Central District of Ahvaz County, Khuzestan Province, Iran. At the 2006 census, its population was 104, in 18 families.

References 

Populated places in Ahvaz County